The United States Department of Defense acknowledges holding six Bahraini detainees in Guantanamo.

A total of 778 captives have been held in extrajudicial detention in the Guantanamo Bay detention camps, in Cuba since the camps opened on January 11, 2002. The camp population peaked in 2004 at approximately 660. Only nineteen new detainees, all "high value detainees" have been transferred there since the United States Supreme Court's ruling in Rasul v. Bush.

Bahraini detainees in Guantanamo

References

Lists of Guantanamo Bay detainees by nationality
Bahrain–United States relations